Abdul Hakim railway station (Urdu and ) is located in Abdul Hakim city, Khanewal district of Punjab province Pakistan.

See also
 List of railway stations in Pakistan
 Pakistan Railways

References

Railway stations in Khanewal District
Railway stations on Khanewal–Wazirabad Line